The Davao Aguilas Football Club (abbreviated as DAFC) is a Filipino professional football club based in the city of Tagum, Davao del Norte. From 2017 to 2018, the club has played in the Philippines Football League (PFL), the highest level of football in Philippines.

During the time of its participation in the PFL, the club was the sole Mindanao-based club in the league. It left from the PFL and was disbanded after the conclusion of the 2018 season, following disagreements regarding supposed successor league to the PFL. However, the club resumed operations again in July 2020, focusing on youth football development.

History

Establishment and entry to the Philippines Football League
The group behind the Aguilas have expressed their interest to play in the Philippines Football League and have submitted their letter of intent before the December 31, 2016 deadline. They were given until the end of January 2017 to complete all licensing requirements.

On February 19, 2017, it was reported that Davao Aguilas FC is joining the Philippines Football League as the sole representative from Mindanao. They conducted tryouts at the Agro pitch in Davao City on February 19, 2017. Though the team's composition is already being organized as early as February 2017, Davao Aguilas lists its foundation date as March 26, 2017.

In March 2017, the club participated in the Stallion preseason cup where Ed Walohan scored the first goal for the club in competitive play. According to team officials the squad fielded by the Aguilas was not the final squad to be fielded in the inaugural PFL.

2017 season
The club hosted an official launch ceremony on March 26, 2017 at the Davao del Norte Sports Complex, their home venue.

By June 2017, the club owners secured a sponsorship deal with San Miguel Corporation and appended "San Miguel" to their official name. On September 18, with the club cut adrift in 7th place, manager Gary Phillips was sacked and replaced by Marlon Maro. The team finished 7th in the inaugural PFL season.

2018 season
In the 2018 season, the club signed in players of the Philippine national team and some foreigners to bolster the squad. Maro resigned in the middle of the season and was replaced by Melchor Anzures. In September 2018, the club signed a partnership agreement with the Japan-based club team, Shonan Bellmare, competing in the J.League. The partnership was formed to bolster cooperation between the two clubs, which includes the development of players and coaches, player scouting, academy and marketing. The Davao Aguilas also changed their full name to "Davao Aguilas Bellmare Football Club" to signify their partnership.

The Davao Aguilas featured in the final of the inaugural Copa Paulino Alcantara where they lost to Kaya-Iloilo due to a solitary goal.

Withdrawal from the PFL
After the 2018 season, it was reported on December 14, 2018 that the club has withdrawn from the PFL. Jefferson Cheng iterated continued support for infrastructure and grassroots development in Davao. Cheng has also cited the decision to hire Bernie Sumayao to manage the PFL despite his volunteering to take over the management of the league. However the league's inaugural season in 2017 was cut short and the PFL was reestablished once again.

The Davao Aguilas were disbanded but Cheng remained involved in local football, sponsoring the youth tournaments through his company Speed Regalo.

Return
In July 2020, the Davao Aguilas announced the resumption of operations its youth department. They first joined seven-a-side football league, and later confirmed interest in playing 2023 Copa Paulino Alcantara.

Crest and colors
The colors of the team are blue which represents "loyalty and brilliance" and red which represents "passion and valor". The red stripes symbolize 5 attributes of the club's players (strength, speed, agility and mentality), while the blue stripes symbolize the concepts of fair play, respect, perseverance and integrity. The colors of the club were selected as reportedly as a show of patriotism and derived after the Philippine flag. The bird's head in the crest is that of a Philippine eagle.

Head coaches

Records

Season by season record

GS – Group stage
R16 – Round of 16
QF – Quarter finals
SF – Semi finals
Bold denotes player currently plays for club

Affiliated clubs
  Shonan Bellmare (2022–present)

Notes

References

Davao Aguilas F.C.
Davao Aguilas
Davao Aguilas
Sports in Davao del Norte
Association football clubs established in 2017
2017 establishments in the Philippines